Sinjar is a 2018 Indian Jasari language film written and directed by Pampally. The movie grabbed the Best Feature Film in Jasari and Indira Gandhi Award for Best Debut Film of a Director at the 65th National Film Awards, which were declared at New Delhi on 13 April 2018. Sinjar also won award in Best Debut Film of a Director. This is the first movie shot in Jasari language.

Plot 

The plot revolves around the protagonist Ansar, his sister Suhara, and Ansar's fiancée Fida. Ansar got engaged to Fida. However, he did not bring her home because as per their custom only after wedding he could bring her home. The movie begins with Suhara and Ansar's fiancée Fida, getting rescued by Ministry of External Affairs form the clench of ISIS terrorists who had abducted them from their workplace in foreign land. They are brought back to Lakshadweep with several other women who too had been to foreign land in pursuit of jobs. It’s only later through the media the islander gets to know that the rescued women were brutally raped by ISIS terrorists. Ansar too gets to know about this. Ansar started weaving doubts about Fida, whether she too was a victim of such brutality. He decides to confront her with his doubt. But as he questioned her, she fell unconscious, and found that she is pregnant. Ansar decides to break up with her before wedding itself. 

Suhara reveals that she is also a victim similar to Fida. This was the topic of discussion among the islanders. Meanwhile, FIDA decides to bring up her kid and bring it up as a pious Muslim.

Cast 
 Musthafa as Ansar
 Srinda Arhaan as Fida
 Mythili as Suhara
 Binoy Nambala as Haris
 Sethulekshmi Amma as Umma
 Munshi Dileep as Hansa
 Kottayam Padman as Ahemed Haji
 Durga as Umma
 Yassar as Subair
 Rishin Sali as Agent
 Lakshmi S. as Fathimathatha 
 Sumaya as Sunaina
 Siyana as Daughter
 P.I.Kunjikoya as Advocate
 Sajad Bright as Asees
 Bamban Kattupuram as Thangal
 Fakrudheen as Mukri
 Noor Varnalayam as Koya
 Gayathri as Lady Doctor
 Awri Rahman as Ward Member

Awards

References

External links 
 

Best Debut Feature Film of a Director National Film Award winners